MV Lochearn was a mail steamer operated by David MacBrayne from Oban to Barra and South Uist from 1930 until 1955. She then became the Sound of Mull mail steamer until 1964, when she was superseded by a new generation of car ferry and sold for further service in the Greek Islands.

History
MV Lochearn and her sister  were built by Ardrossan Dockyard. She was launched on 29 April 1930.

In March 1931 in thick fog, Lochearn ran aground  on a sandbank at Lonbane, Applecross. Lochmor went to assist but she also became stuck. The 85 year old paddle steamer Glencoe successfully towed them both off.

On 14 May 1932, Lochearn struck rocks off Tiree in the Inner Hebrides and was beached. She was later refloated, repaired, and returned to service.

After the war, both sisters were fitted with Paxman Ricardo diesel engines, improving their performance.

With the introduction of the 1964 hoist-loading car ferries,  and Columba, Lochearn became redundant. She and her sister Lochmor were sold to Greek owners on 26 August 1964, renamed Naias and Amimoni and left Scotland for service in the Greek Islands.

In Greece, she was converted to a private motor yacht. It is believed she was broken up in January 1975.

Layout
Lochearn was a passenger and cargo vessel, with cabins for 22 passengers. Passenger accommodation consisted of a dining room, lounge and smoking room, with first and second class cabins. Vehicles were loaded, along with other cargo, using crane and sling.

Service
From 1955 to 1964, she sailed from Tobermory to Oban with calls at Salen, Lochaline and Craignure.

Footnotes

Ferries of Scotland
Ships built in Scotland
MV Lochearn
1930 ships
Maritime incidents in 1932